NA-189 Rajanpur is a newly-created constituency for the National Assembly of Pakistan. It mainly comprises the Rojhan Tehsil and the town of Kot Mithan. It was created in the 2018 delimitation from the bifurcation of the old NA-175.

Election 2018 

Generel Elections were held on 25 October 2018. Sardar Riaz Mhmood Khan Mazari PTI became Member from this constituency.

See also
NA-188 Jampur-cum-Rajanpur
NA-190 Jacobabad

References 

Rajanpur